Rupert Ignaz Mayr (1646 in Schärding – 7 February 1712 in Freising) was a German violinist, composer and Kapellmeister in Munich at the court of Maximilian II Emanuel, Elector of Bavaria.

References

1646 births
1712 deaths
German Baroque composers
German classical violinists
Male classical violinists
German violinists
German male violinists
People from Schärding District
18th-century classical composers
German classical composers
German male classical composers
18th-century German composers
18th-century German male musicians